Mohinder Pratap Chand (1 August 1935 – 19 October 2020) was an Urdu writer and poet of India who promoted Urdu language and literature in India.

Career
In Kurukshetra University (India), he initiated the Bazm-e-Adab (a literary body) and introduced the study of Urdu in the University Curriculum where he taught Urdu as Teacher In-charge for 26 years.  He was the author of over one dozen Urdu and Hindi books, both in poetry and prose, including children's literature in Urdu.

Publications 
 Harf-e-Raaz, Harf-e-Aashna and Aazar-e-Gham-e-Ishq (Anthologies of Urdu poems)
 Zakhm Aarzoo-on ke (Anthology of Urdu poems in Devnagri script)
 Urdu Text Book (Prescribed since 1986 in the school curriculum of 7th grade students of the Haryana state, India)
 ali Panipati ki Ghazlen (Devnagri script), Ed. 
 Laava (A long Urdu poem by Qais Jalandhari'), Ed. 
 Colon Classification: a programmed text (2 Editions in English and one in Hindi) – English ; – Hindi 
 Desh Videsh Ki Kahaniyan (in Hindi), Doodh Ka Mulaya (in Hindi), Doodh ki Qimat (in Urdu) – Folktales of the world;
 'Ujalon Ke Safeer' (a collection of research and critical articles)

Awards and honors

– Honored by 'Adabi Sangam' (Kurukshetra, 1986) and 'Akhil Bharti Tarun Sangam' (Kurukshetra, 1997) for his overall contribution to Urdu and Hindi literature.

– Conferred with the prestigious 'SMH Burney Award' by Haryana Urdu Akademi (1995) for his overall contribution to the promotion of Urdu language and literature

– Honored with 'Naseem-e-Layyah Award' (2004) by the International Bazm-e-Ilm-o-fun, Layyah, Pakistan, for his contribution to Urdu Language and learning

– Conferred with 'Khwaja Altaf Hussain Hali Award' (2006) by the Haryana Waqf Board for promoting the cause of Urdu in the state of Haryana

– Honored with the Title of 'Mahtab-e-Sukhan' (2006) by Navrang Adabi Idara, Ludhiana, Punjab

– Conferred with the 'Bharat Excellence Award' for the year 2009 by the Friendship Forum of India, New Delhi, for his overall contribution to the fields of Education and Literature.

– Conferred with 'Abr Seemabi Award' for the year 2010, by Sahitya Sabha, Kaithal, Haryana, India, for his overall achievements in Urdu Language and Literature.

References

External links
 Biodata and 10 Ghazals 
 News Article about diversities in Urdu 
 News Article about Indo-Pak poets celebrate togetherness 

Chand, Mohinder Pratap
1935 births
2020 deaths
Urdu-language poets from India
Poets from Punjab, India
Kurukshetra University
People from Layyah District
20th-century Indian poets
20th-century Indian educational theorists
20th-century Indian male writers